The Baciu is a right tributary of the river Olt in Romania. It discharges into the Olt in Dobolii de Jos.

References

Rivers of Romania
Rivers of Covasna County